Miguel Iriarte is a Panamanian former professional boxer who, on October 27, 1982, challenged American Jeff Chandler for the American's WBA's world Bantamweight championship, losing to the International Boxing Hall of Famer by a ninth-round technical knockout, at the Resorts International Hotel in Atlantic City, New Jersey, United States.

Professional boxing career 
Apart from his unsuccessful challenge of Chandler, Iriarte also fought the likes of the then future WBA world Junior-Bantamweight champion Rafael Pedroza and future WBA world Super-Bantamweight title challenger, Chile's Benito Badilla, beating Pedroza by ten rounds unanimous points decision on August 30, 1980 in Colon, but losing to Badilla in what was Iriarte's last professional boxing contest, by seventh-round technical knockout on Saturday, November 17, 1984, also in Colon.

Iriarte retired with a record of 12 wins along with 4 losses and 1 draw (tie), in seventeen professional boxing matches, with 8 wins and 2 losses by way of knockout.

See also
List of Panamanians
Alfonso Lopez
Eusebio Pedroza
Hilario Zapata
Jorge Lujan
Roberto Duran

References

Living people
Year of birth missing (living people)
Panamanian male boxers
People from Colón Province
Bantamweight boxers